Marianne Fredriksson, née Persson (March 28, 1927 in Gothenburg – February 11, 2007 in Österskär) was a Swedish author who worked and lived in Roslagen and Stockholm. Before becoming a novelist, she was a journalist for various Swedish newspapers and magazines, including Svenska Dagbladet.

Fredriksson published fifteen novels, most of which have been translated into English, German, Dutch and other languages. Most of her earlier books are based on biblical stories. A central theme in her writings is friendship because, as she maintained, "friendship will be more important than love" in the future.

Bibliography

Fiction
The Book of Eve (Evas bok, 1980)
The Book of Cain (Kains bok, 1981)
The Saga of Norea (Noreas Saga, 1983)
Children of Paradise (Paradisets barn, 1985)
Simon and the Oaks (Simon och ekarna, 1985)
Nightwanderer (Den som vandrar om natten, 1988)
The Enigma (Gåtan, 1989)
(Syndafloden, 1990) (unknown if this book has been translated into English)
Sofie (Blindgång, 1992)
Hanna's Daughters (Anna, Hanna och Johanna, 1994)
According to Mary Magdalene (Enligt Maria Magdalena, 1997)
Inge & Mira (Flyttfåglar, 1999)
Loved children, a k a: Elisabeth's Daughter (Älskade barn, 2001)
(Skilda verkligheter, 2004) (unknown if this book has been translated into English) 
(Ondskans leende, 2006) (unknown if this book has been translated into English)

Non-fiction
The Conditions of the Acacia (På akacians villkor, 1993), written with the architect Bengt Warne
If Women Were Wise the World Would Stop (Om kvinnor vore kloka skulle världen stanna, 1993)
The Eleventh Conspiracy (De elva sammansvurna, 1997), written with her daughter Ann Fredriksson

References

Further reading 
 

1927 births
2007 deaths
People from Gothenburg
Swedish-language writers
Swedish historical novelists
Swedish women novelists
20th-century Swedish novelists
20th-century Swedish women writers
Women historical novelists